The 1978–79 season was the third time Tennis Borussia Berlin played in the 2. Bundesliga, the second highest tier of the German football league system. After 38 league games, Tennis Borussia finished 11th in the division, following a tenth-placed finish the previous year. The club reached the third round of the DFB-Pokal; losing 2–0 at home to 1. FC Nürnberg. Allan Hansen and Norbert Stolzenburg each scored 11 league goals during the season.

1978–79 Tennis Borussia Berlin squad

1978–79 fixtures

Player statistics

Final league position – 11th

References

External links 
 1978–79 Tennis Borussia Berlin season – squad and statistics at fussballdaten.de 

Tennis Borussia Berlin seasons
German football clubs 1978–79 season